The Supercars Championship is a touring car racing category in Australia, running as an International Series under Fédération Internationale de l'Automobile (FIA) regulations, governing the sport.

Supercars events take place in all Australian states and the Northern Territory, with the Australian Capital Territory formerly holding the Canberra 400. An international round is held in New Zealand, while events have previously been held in China, Bahrain, the United Arab Emirates, and the United States. A Melbourne 400 championship event is also held in support of the Australian Grand Prix. The series is broadcast in 137 countries and has an average event attendance of over 100,000, with over 250,000 people attending major events such as the Adelaide 500.

The vehicles used in the series are loosely based on road-going cars. Cars are custom made using a control chassis, with only certain body panels being common between the road cars and race cars. To ensure parity between each make of car, many control components are used. All cars currently use 5.0-litre naturally aspirated V8 engines, but since 2017 have had the option of using four and six cylinder engines, as well as turbochargers. Originally only for Ford Falcons and Holden Commodores, the new generation V8 Supercar regulations, introduced in 2013, opened up the series to more manufacturers. Nissan were the first new manufacturer to commit to the series with four Nissan Altima L33s followed briefly by Erebus Motorsport with Mercedes-Benz E63 AMGs and Garry Rogers Motorsport with Volvo S60s. The series returned to a Ford and Holden duopoly in 2020 with the departure of Nissan, while Ford replaced the Falcon with the Mustang in 2019. Holden announced its final year of competition in 2022, to be replaced by the Chevrolet Camaro for the 2023 season.

History

Group 3A

The concept of a formula centred around V8-engined Fords and Holdens for the Australian Touring Car Championship had been established as early as mid-1991. With the new regulations set to come into effect in 1993, Ford and Holden were both keen to know the details of the new formula by the end of 1991, putting pressure on the Confederation of Australian Motor Sport (CAMS) to provide clarity on the matter. However, CAMS was waiting to see what the FIA did with its proposed international formula for 2.5- and 2.0-litre touring cars.

The new rules for the ATCC were announced in November 1991 and indicated that the V8 cars would be significantly faster than the smaller-engined cars. In 1992, CAMS looked at closing the performance gap between the classes, only to have protests from Ford and Holden, which did not want to see their cars beaten by the smaller cars. In June 1992, the class structure was confirmed:

 Class A: Australian-produced 5.0-litre V8-engined Fords and Holdens
 Class B: 2.0-litre cars complying with FIA Class II Touring Car regulations
 Class C: normally aspirated two-wheel drive cars complying with 1992 CAMS Group 3A Touring Car regulations: This class would only be eligible in 1993.

Both the Ford Falcon EB and Holden Commodore VP ran American-based engines, which were restricted to 7,500 rpm and a compression ratio of 10:1. The Holden teams had the option of using the Group A-developed 5.0-litre Holden V8 engine, although this was restricted to the second-tier privateer teams from 1994 onwards, forcing the major Holden runners to use the more expensive Chevrolet engine. The V8s were first eligible to compete in the endurance races of 1992. The distinctive aerodynamics package, consisting of large front and rear spoilers, was designed partly with this in mind, to give the new cars a better chance of beating the Nissan Skyline GT-Rs in those races.

The new rules meant that cars such as the turbocharged Nissan Skyline GT-R and Ford Sierra RS500 Cosworth were not eligible to compete in 1993, while cars such as the BMW M3 were. However, the M3 received few of the liberal concessions given to the new V8s and also had an extra  added to its minimum weight, so with the Class C cars eligible for 1993 only, the German manufacturer's attention switched to the 2.0-litre class for 1994.

Cars from all three classes would contest the 1993 Australian Touring Car Championship, as well as non-championship Australian touring car events such as the Bathurst 1000. However, for the purposes of race classification and points allocation, cars competed in two classes:
 Over 2,000 cc
 Under 2,000 cc

Originally, the 2.0-litre class cars competed in a separate race to the V8s. This was changed for the second round of 1993 after only nine entrants were in the 2.0-litre class for the first round at Amaroo Park.

With the new regulations intended to be a parity formula, protests by the Holden teams indicated that the Fords had an aerodynamic advantage after they won the opening three rounds, beating the Commodores comprehensively. After round five at Winton, Holden was granted a new front and rear wing package. The BMWs were also allowed new splitters and full DTM-specification rear wings. Disparity between the Fords and Holdens continued to be a talking point during the next few years, with various concessions given to each manufacturer to try to equalise the two cars.

From 1995, the 2.0-litre cars, now contesting their own series as super touring cars, became ineligible for the Australian Touring Car Championship. They did not contest the endurance races at Sandown and Bathurst, leaving these open solely to the 5.0-litre Ford and Holden models.

V8 Supercars

The Australian Vee Eight Super Car Company (AVESCO) – a joint venture between the Touring Car Entrants Group of Australia (TEGA), sports promoters IMG and the Australian Motor Sports Commission – was formed in November 1996 to run the series. This set the foundation for the large expansion of the series during the following years. The category also adopted the name 'V8 Supercars' at this time, though the cars themselves were much unchanged. A new television deal with Network Ten and Fox Sports was organised, although this had follow-on effects for the Bathurst 1000 later in the year.

In February, Tony Cochrane and James Erskine left IMG. Together with David Coe, they formed Sports and Entertainment Limited (SEL) in April 1997. TEGA would have a 75% share in AVESCO, with SEL owning the other 25%. TEGA was responsible for the rules and technical management of the series and the supply of cars and drivers, while SEL was responsible for capturing and maintaining broadcasting rights, sponsorship, licensing, and sanction agreements.

The expansion of the series began in 1998, with the first round to be held in the Northern Territory taking place at Hidden Valley Raceway. In 1999, a new street race on a shortened version of the Adelaide Grand Prix Circuit became one of the first festival-style events, which would become common in later years. Australia's capital city, Canberra, hosted its first event on the Canberra Street Circuit in 2000. In 2001, a championship round was held in New Zealand for the first time, at Pukekohe Park Raceway. In 2002, the V8 Supercar support event at the Indy 300 on the Gold Coast became a championship round, having been a non-championship event since 1994.

Major format changes were made for 1999, with the incorporation of the endurance races into the championship. Control tyres were used for the first time, with Bridgestone selected as the supplier. The series was also renamed from the "Australian Touring Car Championship" to the "Shell Championship Series", by virtue of Shell's sponsorship of the category. Reverse-grid races were introduced for multiple rounds in 2000 before being confined to just the Canberra round for 2001. Also in 2001, compulsory pit stops were introduced at certain rounds and the Top Ten Shootout was used at all rounds. The control tyre supplier changed from Bridgestone to Dunlop in 2002 and the series name was changed to the "V8 Supercar Championship Series" after Shell discontinued their sponsorship.

Project Blueprint

Discussions about parity had returned in 2000, with  trimmed from the front spoiler of the Commodore after Holden, in particular, the Holden Racing Team, had dominated in 1998 and 1999. This was in response to the  removed from the Falcon in previous seasons, and coincided with a  trim from the Falcon's rear spoiler. The small reduction for the Holden teams was quickly addressed with both cars receiving the same front splitter shortly afterwards, but the Falcon's rear wing remained trimmed. Ford had threatened to withdraw from the series, but nothing came of this. After Holden again dominated in 2001 and 2002, a new set of regulations, dubbed "Project Blueprint", was introduced in 2003 to close the performance gap between the Commodore and the Falcon, thus creating closer, fairer racing. Project Blueprint was developed by Paul Taylor and Wayne Cattach, who spent two years designing a formula which would eliminate most of the differences between the Fords and Holdens.

Project Blueprint had the chassis pick-up points, wheelbase, track, and driving position become common across both manufacturers. The Holdens were now able and required to use double-wishbone front suspension, similar to that of the Falcon, rather than the MacPherson struts used previously, and a Watts link at the rear rather than a Panhard. The aerodynamic packages were comprehensively tested and revised and differences in the porting of each of the manufacturers' engines were also removed. The performance of the new Ford BA Falcon and Holden VY and VZ Commodores was fairly even for the next four years, with Ford winning the championship in 2003, 2004, and 2005 and Holden winning in 2006. Reverse-grid races were used at certain events in 2006 before unpopularity with the drivers, teams, and fans saw them abolished halfway through the season.

The Holden VE Commodore caused controversy when it was introduced in 2007. The production model was longer, wider, and taller than the rival Ford BF Falcon and outside of the limits set by Project Blueprint. As a result, the VE race car was granted custom bodywork – namely shortened rear doors and a lowered roofline to meet the regulations. Despite this, the VE was approved for use in the series, along with the BF Falcon, after several months of preseason testing. Sequential gearboxes were introduced in 2008 and became compulsory by the end of the year. In 2009, E85 (a fuel consisting of 85% ethanol and 15% unleaded petrol) was introduced in an effort to improve the environmental image of the sport. Carbon dioxide emissions decreased by up to 50%, but fuel consumption was increased by 30% to produce the same power as before. 2009 also had the introduction of a soft compound tyre at certain events to try to improve the quality of the racing and create different strategies.

In 2005, AVESCO changed its name to V8 Supercars Australia (VESA). The series continued to expand during this time, with races held outside of Australasia for the first time. The series travelled to the Shanghai International Circuit in China in 2005, originally on a five-year agreement, however the promoter of the race dropped their support and the series did not return thereafter. 2006 saw the series travel to the Middle East, with an event held at the Bahrain International Circuit in Bahrain. Multiple new street circuits appeared on the calendar in 2008 and 2009, with new events held in Hamilton in New Zealand, Townsville in North Queensland and at Sydney Olympic Park. The series' Middle East expansion continued in 2010 with a second round held at the Yas Marina Circuit in Abu Dhabi. In November 2010, the series was granted international status by the FIA for the 2011 season, allowing the series to race at up to six international venues each year. As a result, the series name was changed to the 'International V8 Supercars Championship'.

2008 saw the separate boards of directors of VESA and TEGA merge into a single board that was solely responsible for the administration of the category. The new board of directors was composed of four TEGA representatives, two members from SEL and two independent directors. In 2011, TEGA and SEL entered a sale agreement with Australian Motor Racing Partners (AMRP), which had significant financial backing from Archer Capital. This agreement saw SEL lose its 25% stake in V8 Supercars, with Archer Capital taking up a 60% share and TEGA the other 40%. A new board of directors was appointed, with two TEGA representatives and two AMRP representatives.

In 2011, Archer Capital purchased a 65% shareholding in the series with the teams owning the other 35%. In December 2021, both Archer Capital and the teams sold their shareholdings to Race Australia Consolidated Enterprises.

New Generation V8 Supercar

In the middle of 2008, a project led by Mark Skaife was organised by V8 Supercars to investigate future directions for the sport. The project had the primary objective of cutting costs to $250,000 per car through the use of control parts and to create a pathway for new manufacturers to enter the series, provided that they have a four-door saloon car in mass production. The new formula, called "Car of the Future", was scheduled to be introduced before or during the 2012 season. The plan was publicly unveiled in March 2010 and was shown to incorporate several key changes to the internal workings of the car. The chassis and the cooling, fuel and electronics systems would all be changed to control parts, with changes to the engine, drivetrain, rear suspension, wheels and the control brake package. The safety of the cars was also to be reviewed and improved. While the plans were well received by all of the teams, Holden Motorsport boss Simon McNamara warned potential new manufacturers to stay out of the championship just hours after the plans were released, claiming that they would "gain nothing" from entering the series.

In 2011, it was announced that the Car of the Future would not be introduced until 2013. In February 2012, Nissan confirmed that they would enter the series under Car of the Future regulations with Kelly Racing. Later in 2012, Australian GT Championship team Erebus Motorsport announced they would be running Mercedes-Benz cars in the championship, taking over Stone Brothers Racing. In June 2013, Volvo announced it would enter the series in 2014 in a collaboration with its motorsport arm, Polestar Racing and Garry Rogers Motorsport. In November 2013 the Car of the Future moniker was dropped in favour of the name "New Generation V8 Supercar".

The series continued its international expansion in 2013, with the first event in North America held at the Circuit of the Americas in Austin, Texas. In 2015, five drivers took part in a series of demonstration races at the Kuala Lumpur Street Circuit as part of the KL City Grand Prix. This was intended to be a precursor to the series holding a championship event at the circuit in 2016, in a push from CEO James Warburton to build series exposure in Asia. The event was later cancelled due to legal issues affecting the circuit.

Supercars Championship
In April 2016, the series reached an agreement with Virgin Australia to rename the series to the Virgin Australia Supercars Championship on 1 July.

Gen 2 Supercar
In December 2014, Supercars released details concerning the future of the category. New regulations, dubbed Gen2 Supercar, were introduced in 2017 to allow the use of two-door coupé body styles and turbocharged four- or six-cylinder engines. However, no teams have elected to build cars to these alternate engine specifications as of 2020. Cars are still required to be based on front-engined, rear-wheel drive, four-seater production cars that are sold in Australia. The chassis and control components will be carried over from the New Generation V8 Supercar regulations, while engine and aerodynamic parity will be reviewed.

Supercar specifications

The current New Generation V8 Supercar regulations are an evolution of the previous Project Blueprint regulations. The regulations control many aspects of the car to ensure parity between the manufacturers, allowing for minor differences in the engines and body shapes so that the cars bear some resemblance to their production counterparts. The regulations were also designed to lower the costs of building and repairing a car.

Bodyshell
The body of each car is based on its corresponding production car. However, due to the regulations governing the dimensions of the cars to ensure parity, the race cars are lowered and shortened or lengthened to meet the regulations. As of 2020, only the Ford Mustang GT and Holden ZB Commodore are competing. To save costs, the front guards, passenger-side front door, rear doors and rear quarter panels are made from composite materials. The tail lamps are carried over from the road car, while the windscreen is replaced by a polycarbonate unit. The 2023 Repco Supercars Championship will be the first under the new Gen3 ruleset. From 2023, the Chevrolet Camaro ZL1 will join the Ford Mustang GT on the grid.

The bodies are built around a control chassis, featuring a full roll cage, originally designed by PACE Innovations but which can be made, or partially made, by other accredited builders, including certain race teams. Many safety features are utilised to protect the driver in the event of a crash. The fuel tank is positioned in front of the rear axle to prevent it from being damaged or ruptured in a rear end impact. The driver is seated towards the centre of the car and extra reinforcement is used on the roll cage on the driver's side to lessen the risk of injury in a side-on collision. The cars also feature a collapsible steering column and a fire extinguisher system.

Aerodynamics
All cars have an aerodynamics package consisting of a front spoiler and splitter, side skirts and a rear wing. The aerodynamics package for each manufacturer is homologated after a series of tests which ensure that the different body styles produce near-identical downforce and drag numbers.

Weight
The minimum weight of each car is  including the driver, with a minimum load of 755 kg over the front axle. The minimum weight for the driver is 100 kg and includes the driver dressed in a full racing suit, the seat and seat mountings and any ballast needed to meet the minimum weight. Some other components also have a minimum weight, such as the engine (200 kg) and the front uprights (10.5 kg each).

Engine and drivetrain
All cars must be front-engined and rear-wheel-drive, powered by an engine configuration, be that 4, 6, or 8 cylinders (or other) that do not exceed the Supercars accumulated engine power output and weighted average. All cars currently use a 5.0-litre, naturally aspirated, V8-engine with indirect electronic fuel injection, capable of producing between 460 and 485 kW (620–650 bhp) at the maximum allowed 7500rpm. Manufacturers are free to choose between using an engine based on one from their own line up or a generic engine provided by Supercars. Both Ford and Holden use US-based racing engines with pushrod actuated valves and two valves per cylinder. Mercedes, Nissan, and Volvo used modified versions of their own engines, with hydraulic-lift valves and four valves per cylinder. All engines are electronically limited to 7,500 rpm and have a compression ratio of 10:1.

Power is transferred from the engine to the rear wheels through a six-speed sequential transaxle with an integrated spool differential. The individual gear ratios and the final drive ratio are fixed with drop gears at the front of the transaxle allowing the teams to alter the overall transmission ratio for different circuits. The cars use a triple plate clutch. The cars run on E85 fuel with a fuel tank capacity of 112 litres.

An electronic control unit (ECU), provided by MoTeC, is used to monitor and optimise various aspects of the engine's performance. Numerous sensors in the car collect information which is then transmitted to the team, allowing them to monitor things such as tyre wear and fuel consumption and find potential problems with the car. The ECU is also used by officials during the scrutineering process.

Suspension
All cars are required to use a double wishbone setup for the front suspension and independent rear suspension. Both the front and rear suspension systems feature adjustable shock absorbers and an anti-roll bar which can be adjusted from the cockpit.

Brakes
The cars use disc brakes supplied by AP Racing on the front and rear, with the master cylinders provided by AP Racing or former control brake supplier Alcon.

Wheels and tyres
The cars use  control wheels, produced by Rimstock and supplied by Racer Industries, and control tyres from Dunlop. The slick tyre is available in both hard and soft compounds, with teams required to use either or both compounds in each race, depending on the event. A grooved wet tyre is used in damp conditions.

Cost
The New Generation V8 Supercar regulations were intended to reduce the cost of building a car (without engine) from around $450,000 to $250,000, with the cost of an engine coming down from around $120,000 to $50,000.

Unfortunately the regulations didn't reduce the costs of making a new Supercar with costs estimated to be around $600,000 for a new car.

The costs of competing in the championship are considerably higher than the purchase price of a car.  There is no budget cap, though caps have been proposed.  One estimate puts the season cost for teams at "1.2 to 3 million (Australian) dollars per car" per season.

Series structure

Teams and drivers
In order to compete in the Supercars Championship, drivers are required to hold a CAMS National Circuit Competition Licence, or a licence of an equivalent or higher level. Each car entered is required to have a Teams Racing Charter (TRC), formerly known as a Racing Entitlements Contract. A TRC is a contract between Supercars and a team which outlines the team's entitlements and obligations. TRCs may be leased by their owners to another party for a maximum of two years, after which the owner must either use it themselves or sell it. A racing number is tied to each TRC, with teams able to apply for a TRC number to be changed. The defending series champion is entitled to use the number 1, with the original TRC number of that car reserved and not able to be used by another team without the agreement of its owner.

The TRCs were originally issued in 1999. Known as TEGA franchise agreements, they were divided into three categories – Level 1, Level 2 and Level 3. Twelve Level 1 franchises were issued to those teams that had competed in the series full-time since its inception in 1997:

A thirteenth was later issued to Bob Forbes Racing. A Level 1 franchise required a team to race at least one car at all events, and at various times allowed a team to enter up to four cars. Other teams received Level 2 and Level 3 franchises based on their level of participation. The structure was changed a number of times before the present system of 28 RECs was arrived at in 2011. Supercars bought a number of RECs as they became available in order to achieve a long-held desire to reduce the field to 28 cars.

At the end of 2013, Lucas Dumbrell Motorsport, Tony D'Alberto Racing and Triple F Racing each returned a REC to Supercars. These were put up for sale in 2014, but no bids were received. One was reclaimed by Lucas Dumbrell Motorsport in 2015 after a legal fight. At the end of 2014, a further REC was returned by James Rosenberg Racing. In April 2015, Supercars launched a tender for one REC for the 2016 season, with Triple Eight the successful bidder.

Teams consist of one to four cars, with most one-car teams forming a technical alliance with a larger team. Only the REC holders are allowed to compete at each event, although "wildcard" entries are accepted for the endurance races, with a maximum of six extra cars on top of the regular 28. Both Supercars and Development Series teams have entered wildcard entries in previous years. In 2014, the first wildcard entry for a sprint race was issued when Dick Johnson Racing entered a third car for Marcos Ambrose at the Sydney 500.

Teams are required to employ a co-driver for each car during the three endurance races due to the increased race distance and the need for driver substitutions during the race. Teams were able to pair their full-time drivers in one car until a rule change in 2010 that required each full-time driver to remain in his own car and be joined by a co-driver not competing full-time in the series. The Drivers Championship title is awarded to the driver who accumulates the most points over the course of the season. If there is a points tie for the series win, the champion will be decided based on the number of races won by each driver (if there is still a tie, it is based on second-place finishes and so on). Teams also compete for the Teams Championship, with the champion team being decided in the same manner as the Drivers Championship. For Teams Championship points scoring purposes, teams with four cars are separated into a pair of two-car teams, while teams with three cars are split into a two-car team and a single-car team. The Teams Championship dictates the pit lane order for the following season.

The defending driver has the right to carry the number 1 the following year. However, Shane van Gisbergen and Scott McLaughlin elected to retain their existing numbers in 2017, 2019, 2020 and 2022.

Development series

A second-tier series, the Dunlop Super2 Series, is run as a support category to the main series at certain events. Initially for privateers who did not have the funding of the professional teams in the late 1990s, the series now serves the dual purpose of developing young drivers before they compete in the main series and a means for main series teams to give their endurance co-drivers more racing experience prior to the endurance races. Teams in the Dunlop Super2 Series compete with cars previously used in the main series.

A third V8 Supercar-based series, the Kumho Tyres V8 Touring Car Series, has been run since 2008 but has no involvement with the Supercars Championship or Dunlop Super2 Series, instead running on the programme of the Shannons Nationals Motor Racing Championships. However, since 2016, several rounds have been run as support categories at Supercars events.

Race formats
In 2023, there are three racing formats, SuperSprint, two-race rounds and endurance.

In previous years formats included SuperSprint events, International SuperSprint events, SuperStreet events and Enduro Cup events.

Qualifying 
In 2023, there are two qualifying formats, format 1 and format 2. In format 1, the grid position for a race is determine a single qualifying session with all drivers taking part. In format 2, qualifying is split up into 3 sessions. In Q1 the back five grid positions are filled by the five slowest cars with the remaining cars advancing to Q2. In Q2 the same process is repeated for the next 10 grid positions. In Q3 the top 10 grid positions are filled either using a normal qualifying session or by giving each driver one chance to set a lap time in a 'top-ten shoot-out'.

Multiple races in the same location during a race weekend may or may not use different qualifying formats.

SuperSprint

In 2023, the SuperSprint format will be used for the Melbourne SuperSprint (previously known as the Melbourne 400), the Perth SuperSprint, the Tasmania SuperSprint, the Sydney SuperNight, the Darwin Triple Crown and The Bend SuperSprint.

The format was previously used for the Phillip Island SuperSprint, Winton SuperSprint and the Ipswich SuperSprint.

The SuperSprint format generally involves two races, each with separate qualifying sessions, on the Saturday and the Sunday. Some races use the same qualifying format for each race while other use format 1 and 2 on different days.

In previous years The Phillip Island and Sydney Motorsport Park events feature a single one-hour practice session on Saturday, while all other SuperSprint events have two one-hour practice sessions on the Friday with a fifteen-minute practice session on Saturday. The Winton and Ipswich events feature an extra thirty-minute session on Friday for endurance co-drivers. The SuperSprint format features a fifteen-minute qualifying session held on Saturday to decide the grid for the race on the same day. A single twenty-minute session is held on Sunday morning to decide the grid for the Sunday race. The Darwin event also features a top ten shootout (a session where the fastest ten qualifiers complete one flying lap each to determine the top ten on the grid) following the Sunday qualifying session. A single  race is held on Saturday with a single  race held on Sunday.

International SuperSprint
The International SuperSprint format was used at the Auckland SuperSprint.

Three thirty-minute practice sessions are held on Friday, while Saturday and Sunday both consist of two ten-minute qualifying sessions which set the grid for the pair of  races held on each day.

Two-race Weekends 
The two-race round format, previously known as the SuperStreet format, covers those races not branded as a SuperSprint or an endurance race. In 2023 the format will be used in the Newcastle 500, the Townsville 400, the Gold Coast 500 and the Adelaide 500. The format was previously used for the Melbourne 400.

This format generally involves two races on the Saturday and Sunday of the race weekend, 200 or 250 km in length. Unlike the SuperSprint, refuelling is allowed.

In previous years, two forty-minute practice sessions took place on the Friday at each SuperStreet event, while a twenty-minute practice session is held on the Saturday at Adelaide. The Adelaide event features a twenty-minute qualifying session on Friday to determine the grid for the Saturday race, while the Townsville and Newcastle events have a single twenty-minute session on Saturday. All three events feature a twenty-minute session followed by a top ten shootout on Sunday. Both the Adelaide 500 and the Newcastle 500 feature a single  race on each of Saturday and Sunday, while the Townsville and Melbourne event features a  race on each of Saturday and Sunday.

Endurance races

In 2023, there are two endurance races, the Bathurst 1000 and the Sandown 500. In previous years, the Gold Coast race was run as an endurance race and the driver who won the most points over the three races was awarded the Enduro Cup.

This format is a single endurance race over either 500 or 1000 km with refuelling allowed and multiple drivers required. The Bathurst race takes around six hours to complete with the Sandown race taking around half that.

In previous years, the Sandown 500 and the Gold Coast 600 both featured three thirty-minute practice sessions held on Friday, with Sandown having an extra session on Saturday. Practice for the Bathurst 1000 consists of six one-hour sessions held across Thursday, Friday and Saturday. Qualifying for the Sandown 500 involves a twenty-minute session followed by a pair of  "qualifying races" held on Saturday. The grid for the first race is based on the qualifying session; the grid for the second race is based on the results of the first. The results of the second race determine the grid for the main race on Sunday. Co-drivers must compete in the first of the qualifying races while the main driver must compete in the second. The Bathurst 1000 features a single forty-minute qualifying session on Friday afternoon followed by a top ten shootout on Saturday. The Gold Coast 600 has two twenty-minute qualifying sessions, one each on Saturday and Sunday, with the Sunday session followed by a top ten shootout. The Sandown 500 and Bathurst 1000 both have a twenty-minute warm-up session on Sunday morning.

The Gold Coast 600 consists of two  races with one held on Saturday and one on Sunday.

Points system
Points are awarded as follows at all championship events. Various different points scales are applied to events having one, two, three or four races, ensuring that a driver will be awarded 300 points for winning all races at any event. Points are awarded to all cars that have covered 75% of the race distance, provided they are running at the completion of the final lap and with a final lap time within 200% of the race winner's fastest lap. At the endurance events, both drivers earn the total points awarded to the finishing position of the car.

Notable events

Bathurst 1000

The Bathurst 1000, also known as the "Great Race" and held in some form since 1960, is the most famous race on the Supercars calendar, as well as the longest both in terms of race distance and race time. The race is run over 161 laps of the Mount Panorama Circuit,  in total, taking between six and seven hours to complete. The event has historically attracted crowds of nearly 200,000 people. The Peter Brock Trophy, named after nine-time Bathurst 1000 winner Peter Brock, is awarded to the winners of the race. The trophy was introduced in 2006 following Brock's death in a crash at the Targa West rally one month prior to the race.

Adelaide 500

The Adelaide 500, also known as the "Clipsal 500" and "Superloop 500" under former sponsorship names, is the premier car race in South Australia. It is the largest V8 Supercars race in the country by crowd numbers. Beginning in 1999, the race is held in the eastern streets of the Adelaide CBD, on a reduced version of the Adelaide Street Circuit previously used by the Grand Prix. After being shut down in 2020 by former Liberal premier Steven Marshall over alleged "cost-blow outs" due to Coronavirus, the race has been revived by the victory of SA Labor Leader Peter Malinauskas in the 2022 South Australian state election, and is set for a blockbuster return in early December 2022, with Supercars Australia committed to bringing it back "bigger then ever". Held over four days, the event consists of two 250 kilometre races for the V8 Supercars, and additionary practise and qualifying races. The event has several categories of races throughout the four days, including Super2 Series, Formula 5000, SuperUtes Series, Touring Car Masters, Australian GT, and the Australian Carrera Cup as well as others. The race is accompanied by live music performances, of which the likes of Kiss, Keith Urban and Robbie Williams have previously performed, as well as food, activities, and an RAAF F/A 18A Hornet display each day in the skies above the city. The last champion of the Adelaide 500 was Scott Mclaughlin in 2020.

Sandown 500

The Sandown 500 was first held as a six-hour race in 1964 and has been labelled as the traditional "Bathurst warm-up" race. Like the Bathurst 1000, the Sandown 500 is run over 161 laps. Due to the shorter track length of Sandown Raceway, the race is only  and runs for between three and four hours. The Sandown 500 was not held for Supercars from 1999 to 2002 and from 2008 to 2011. During these years, the  endurance races took place at Queensland Raceway (1999–2002) and the Phillip Island Grand Prix Circuit (2008–2011).

Gold Coast 600

The Gold Coast 600 was introduced in 2009 after the American IndyCar Series elected not to return to the Surfers Paradise circuit that year. The A1 Grand Prix series was scheduled to fill the void left by IndyCar, however the owners of the series went into liquidation in June 2009 and, as a result, the A1 Grand Prix cars were withdrawn from the event. In order to compensate for this, Supercars introduced a new four-race format, with two  races held on each day. In 2010 the format changed to include two  races and it became a two-driver event. To restore the event's previous international flavour, each team was required to have at least one co-driver with an 'international reputation' (that is, they were recognised for exploits in motorsport outside of Australia). In 2011 and 2012, all entries required an international co-driver. In 2013 the international co-driver rule was dropped, due to a number of incidents during the 2012 event and the formation of the Endurance Cup, but teams could still choose to employ an international driver for the endurance races.

Newcastle 500

In 2004, Supercars introduced the name "Grand Finale" for the final round of the season (having called it "The Main Event" in 2003 and the "V8 Ultimate" in 2001 and 2002). The Grand Finale was held at Sandown Raceway in 2001 and 2002, Sydney Motorsport Park in 2003 and 2004, Phillip Island in 2005, 2006 and 2007 and Oran Park Raceway in 2008. The Grand Finale name was used until 2008 before the Sydney 500 became the final event of the series in 2009. The Sydney 500 was held around the streets of Sydney Olympic Park. Its format was similar to the Adelaide 500, with a  race held on both Saturday and Sunday. Despite having a relatively simple layout, the circuit was one of the more challenging on the calendar – as evidenced in the 2010 Saturday race when, in wet conditions, the top three championship runners all slid into the wall at the same time – effectively handing the title to James Courtney. The Sydney 500 was held for the final time in 2016.

Media coverage

Television
The series is currently broadcast on Fox Sports and the Seven Network. Fox Sports shows all practice and qualifying sessions live along with the races. Seven shows only seven events live which are Adelaide, Melbourne, Townsville, Sandown, Bathurst, Gold Coast and Newcastle with the rest shown as a highlights package after the races have finished. The coverage is produced by Supercars Media, a specialist production company for Supercars Australia. Supercars Media provides the commentary for each race, with former champion and Bathurst winner Mark Skaife as lead commentator, along with Neil Crompton as expert commentator. Both Fox Sports and Seven use their own commentary team for pre- and post-race coverage. Supercars Media records the series in 1080i high-definition, with many cars carrying four or more onboard-cameras, though HD coverage is available only to subscribers of Foxtel HD.

In 2020, Seven Network and Foxtel signed a five-year deal worth $200 million to televise the Repco Supercars Championship from 2021 to 2025. Seven Network will broadcast six rounds live and show highlights for other races it is not able to broadcast. Foxtel's deal remains the same, it will show all races live and ad free on Fox Sports.

The series had previously been broadcast on Seven Network, from 1963 to 1996 and from 2007 to 2014, Network Ten and Fox Sports from 1997 to 2006 and from 2015 to 2020, During the years of Network Ten and Fox Sports continued to broadcast the series once a year for the Melbourne 400 championship races, which are a support category at the Formula One Rolex Australian Grand Prix, which was broadcast by Ten and Fox Sports. Previously when the Nine Network held the Formula One Rolex Australian Grand Prix broadcast rights in Australia, they would broadcast the Supercars support races at the Formula One Rolex Australian Grand Prix. All support category races were tied up with the Formula One Rolex Australian Grand Prix broadcast rights as a package.

Ten's television series RPM, which has aired from 1997 to 2008, in 2011 and from 2015 onwards, has covered Supercars, alongside other motorsports. From 2007 to 2014, Seven broadcast a weekly 25-minute show titled V8Xtra on non-racing weekends. The dedicated Supercars program covered news and feature items relating to the series. Since 2015, Fox Sports has broadcast a similar show, Inside Supercars, a weekly one-hour long program featuring a panel led by Rust and Mark Skaife. In the same year, Fox Sports also launched an observational show Supercars Life, featuring behind the scenes footage from race weekends and features on drivers' lives away from the track. In 2018, Inside Supercars was superseded by a new show on Fox Sports, Supercars Trackside. Instead of being filmed in a studio midweek, the show is filmed on the Thursday before and the Sunday after each race meeting at the circuit.

The television broadcast of the Bathurst 1000 has won a Logie Award for the Most Outstanding Sports Coverage seven times, most recently for the 2017 Bathurst 1000. Foxtel broadcast the 2018 Bathurst 1000 in 4K resolution, the first such broadcast in Australian sport.

Current TV broadcasters
Supercars races are broadcast on the following channels:

Other media

The series has its own live streaming pay-per-view service, Superview. The service, which started in 2013, currently shows all races as well as qualifying sessions. The service is not available in New Zealand and Australia due to their current broadcasting rights with Sky Sport and Fox Sports.

The series has its own website, which contains information about the series, drivers, teams and events and news articles, and a radio show, V8 Insiders. News is also featured on motorsport websites such as Speedcafe, V8X Magazine and Touring Car Times. A media deal with News Corp Australia has been in place since 2009.

Video games

Supercars have made several licensed appearances in video games, including in Codemasters' V8 Supercars series in the 2000s and Turn 10 Studios' Forza series in the 2010s. From 2011 to 2014, an online championship, sanctioned by Supercars, was contested on iRacing. In 2017, Supercars launched an eSports competition using Forza Motorsport 6 and Forza Motorsport 7, which expanded to six rounds in 2018. The Supercars Eseries moved to the iRacing platform in 2019 with championship teams including Triple Eight Race Engineering and Walkinshaw Andretti United entering teams into the series alongside eSports teams. An additional Eseries was held in mid 2020 with all championship drivers competing during the hiatus caused by the COVID-19 pandemic.

Records

 Figures accurate as of 9 October 2022 (after Race 30 of the 2022 Supercars Championship).
 Bold text indicates active full-time drivers, teams and manufacturers.
 Italics indicates drivers who are still active, but not on a full-time basis.
 The above records relate to the Australian Touring Car Championship (1960–1998), the Shell Championship Series (1999–2001), the V8 Supercar Championship Series (2002–2010), International V8 Supercars Championship (2011–2016) and the Supercars Championship (2016–present).

See also

 Australian Touring Car Championship
 List of Australian Touring Car and V8 Supercar champions
 List of Australian Touring Car Championship races
 List of Australian Touring Car and V8 Supercar driver records
 Supercars Hall of Fame

References

Works cited

External links

Supercars Australia website

Auto racing series in Australia
Motorsport categories in Australia
Professional sports leagues in Australia
Recurring sporting events established in 1997
Sports leagues established in 1997
 
Touring car racing series
1997 establishments in Australia